Featuring...Ice Cube is a compilation album by American rapper Ice Cube. It was released on December 16, 1997, by Priority Records. The material featured on the compilation spans a length of about seven years. The earliest tracks are taken from the 1990 album AmeriKKKa's Most Wanted while "Bend a Corner Wit Me" was a brand new release at the time. The compilation was released while Ice Cube was enjoying notoriety from his recent success with Westside Connection.  Despite the title, several of the tracks were originally released on Ice Cube's studio albums and featured other artists.  The album was produced by Ice Cube with A&R and marketing by Joel Conrad Bechtolt and Greg Danylyshn for Priority Records. Featuring...Ice Cube was a Billboard Top 40 Hip-Hop/ R&B hit and went gold in 1998.

Track listing

Charts

References

Ice Cube albums
1997 compilation albums
Gangsta rap compilation albums